The Maple Street Covered Bridge, also called the Lower Covered Bridge and the Fairfax Covered Bridge, is a covered bridge that carries Maple Street across Mill Brook off State Route 104 in Fairfax, Vermont. Built in 1865, it is the town's only historic covered bridge, and is a rare two-lane covered bridge in the state. It was listed on the National Register of Historic Places in 1974.

Description and history
The Maple Street Covered Bridge is located on the south side of Fairfax village, carrying Maple Street across Mill Brook, a tributary of the nearby Lamoille River, between the village center and Bellows Free Academy. The bridge is a single-span structure of Town lattice design, set on abutments of stone and concrete. Iron tie rods join the tops of the flanking trusses to provide lateral stability, and the bridge deck is made of wooden planking. The exterior is clad in vertical board siding, which ends short of the eaves on the sides. The siding extends a short way on the interior of each portal.

The bridge was built in 1865 by Kingsbury and Stone.  It is the town's only surviving 19th-century covered bridge, and is rare in the state as an example of a two-lane bridge, built to accommodate significant village traffic.  A major renovation was conducted in 1990-1991 by Jan Lewandoski.  Debate is conducted to this day as to whether the bridge is now "backwards".  When it was washed off its foundations by the Flood of 1927 it is unknown whether the bridge was put back on in the same direction as it was originally.  Some say the eastern portal now faces west, and vice versa.

See also
 
 
 
 
 List of covered bridges in Vermont
 National Register of Historic Places listings in Franklin County, Vermont
 List of bridges on the National Register of Historic Places in Vermont

References

External links

Buildings and structures in Fairfax, Vermont
Bridges completed in 1865
Covered bridges on the National Register of Historic Places in Vermont
Wooden bridges in Vermont
Covered bridges in Franklin County, Vermont
National Register of Historic Places in Franklin County, Vermont
Road bridges on the National Register of Historic Places in Vermont
Lattice truss bridges in the United States
1865 establishments in Vermont